"Tragedy + Time" is a song by American rock band Rise Against. The song was released as the second single from their seventh album, titled The Black Market. The song impacted radio on October 21, 2014. According to lead singer Tim McIlrath, the title of the song comes from the phrase "tragedy plus time equals comedy". The song is a playable track in Guitar Hero Live.

Reception
Mischa Pearlman of Alternative Press praised the song's chorus, calling it "one of the band’s most catchy, anthemic choruses". Max Qayyum of Punknews.org said that "despite being the poppiest song on the record", he found the track sincere and noted how it would work as the penultimate track. Ryan Bray of Consequence of Sound called the song "overlong but catchy". Dan H. of Sputnikmusic criticized the song for being "extraneous even amidst the variety".

Music video
A music video for the song was released on November 6, 2014. A lyric video was released for the song earlier on October 21, 2014.

Charts

Weekly charts

References

Rise Against songs
2014 songs
Interscope Records singles
Songs written by Tim McIlrath
American pop punk songs
American alternative rock songs